Luciano Catenacci (13 April 1933 – 4 October 1990) was an Italian actor and production manager who worked on mainly Italian produced films during the 1960s, 1970s and 1980s.

Life and career
Born in Rome, Catenacci started his career as a production manager, and was later convinced by several directors including Mario Bava to move into acting. After appearing in several films with the pseudonyms Luciano Lorcas and Max Lawrence, in the early 1970s he definitely started being credited with his real name. Mainly cast in roles of villains and criminals, he is best known for his performance as Benito Mussolini in Damiano Damiani's The Assassin of Rome.

Selected filmography

La vendetta di Lady Morgan (1965) - Physician (uncredited)
Z7 Operation Rembrandt (1966)
Kill, Baby, Kill (1966) - Karl the Burgomeister
Fury of Johnny Kid (1967) - Campos Henchman
Come rubare un quintale di diamanti in Russia (1967) - Brett
The Stranger Returns (1967) - Townsman (uncredited)
Halleluja for Django (1967) - Jarrett Gang
Un colpo da re (1967) - Gangmember
Black Jesus (1968) - Sergeant
Hell in Normandy (1968) - Navy Sailor
 The Son of Black Eagle (1968)
Hamisha Yamim B'Sinai (1968) - Arden
The Battle of El Alamein (1969) - Sgt. O'Hara
A Complicated Girl (1969)
The Battle of the Damned (1969) - Sgt. Dean
Hour X Suicide Patrol (1969) - Pvt. Jimmy Clay
36 ore all'inferno (1969) - Landing
Uccidete Rommel (1969) - Italian Soldier
Rangers: attacco ora X (1970) - Sergeant Francone
In the Folds of the Flesh (1970) - Antoine
Bolidi sull'asfalto a tutta birra! (1970) - Official in Riccione race
El último día de la guerra (1970) - German Aide
Colt in the Hand of the Devil (1970) - El Loco
Due bianchi nell'Africa nera (1970) - Col. Von Tambler
Blackie the Pirate (1971) - Chain (uncredited)
Confessions of a Police Captain (1971) - Ferdinando Lomunno
The Price of Death (1971) - Sheriff Tom Stanton
Short Night of Glass Dolls (1971) - Morgue Employee
Ben and Charlie (1972) - Kurt
It Can Be Done Amigo (1972) - James
The Assassin of Rome (1972) - Benito Mussolini
La Scoumoune (1972)
The Sicilian Connection (1972) - Tony
We Want the Colonels (1973) - The Highway Patroller
Super Bitch (1973) - Gamble
Here We Go Again, Eh Providence? (1973) - Count de Ortega
Long Lasting Days (1973) - Spyros
Italian Graffiti (1973) - Il Reverendo
Almost Human (1974) - Ugo Majone
Carambola! (1974) - Cpt. Howard Johnson
How to Kill a Judge (1975) - Meloria the Attorney
Manhunt in the City (1975) - Lt. Pascucci
Syndicate Sadists (1975) - Conti
Go Gorilla Go (1975) - The Manager of the Shooting Range
The Tough Ones (1976) - Ferdinando Gerace
Crime Busters (1977) - Fred 'Curly' Cline
The Biggest Battle (1978) - British Communications Officer
Goodbye & Amen (1978) - Vincent
Brothers Till We Die (1978) - Adalberto Maria Perrone
Odds and Evens (1978) - Paragoulis the Greek
L'ultimo guappo (1978) - Don Pasquale Ronciglio
A Dangerous Toy (1979) - A bodyguard of Griffo
A Man on His Knees (1979) - The commissioner
Lion of the Desert (1980) - Italian Soldier
Moving Out (1983) - Maria's Father
Street Hero (1984) - Ciccio
Initiation (1987) - The Bit Part 
Evil Angels (1988) - The Jury
The Bit Part (1988) - Mario
The Dark Sun (1990) - Commissioner Catena
Volevo i pantaloni (1990) - Michele

References

External links
 

 

1933 births
1990 deaths
20th-century Italian male actors
Italian male film actors
Male actors from Rome